Katrin Staffler ( Mair, born 4 November 1981) is a German politician of the Christian Social Union (CSU) who has been serving as a member of the Bundestag from the state of Bavaria since 2017, representing the constituency of Fürstenfeldbruck.

Early life and career 
Staffler studied biochemistry at the Technical University of Munich from 2001 until 2006. After working at the university for several years, she became a spokesperson at HypoVereinsbank in 2015.

Political career 
Staffler became member of the Bundestag after the 2017 German federal election, representing Fürstenfeldbruck in Bavaria. She is a member of the Committee on Education, Research and Technology Assessment and the Committee on European Union Affairs. In this capacity, she serves as her parliamentary group's rapporteur on universities. 

In addition to her committee assignments, Staffler is part of the German Parliamentary Friendship Group for Relations with Slovakia, the Czech Republic and Hungary. Since 2019, she has also been a member of the German delegation to the Franco-German Parliamentary Assembly.

Other activities
 University of Hagen, Member of the Parliamentary Advisory Board (since 2022)

References

External links 

  
 Bundestag biography 

1981 births
Living people
Members of the Bundestag for Bavaria
Female members of the Bundestag
21st-century German women politicians
Members of the Bundestag 2021–2025
Members of the Bundestag 2017–2021
People from Dachau
Members of the Bundestag for the Christian Social Union in Bavaria